A rampage killer has been defined as follows:

This list should contain, for each category, the first fifteen cases with at least one of the following features:
 Rampage killings with 6 or more dead 
 Rampage killings with at least 4 people killed and at least ten victims overall (dead plus injured)
 Rampage killings with at least 2 people killed and at least 12 victims overall (dead plus injured)
 An incidence of rampage killing shall not be included in this list if it does not include at least two people killed.
 In all cases the perpetrator is not counted among those killed or injured.
The separate articles for the different categories have more extensive lists.

Africa
Only the first 15 entries are shown here. For the entire list see: List of rampage killers in Africa

This section contains cases that occurred in Africa and the Middle East. Not included are school massacres, workplace killings, hate crimes or familicides, which form their own categories.

Americas
Only the first 15 entries are shown here. For the entire list see: List of rampage killers in the Americas and List of rampage killers in the United States

This section contains cases that occurred in the Americas.

Not included are school massacres, workplace killings, hate crimes or familicides, which form their own categories.

Asia
Only the first 15 entries are shown here. For the entire list see: List of rampage killers in Asia and List of rampage killers in China

This section contains cases that occurred in Asia. Not included are school massacres, workplace killings, hate crimes, or familicides, which form their own categories.

Europe
Only the first 15 entries are shown here. For the entire list see: List of rampage killers in Europe

This section contains cases that occurred in Europe.

Not included are school massacres, workplace killings, hate crimes or familicides, which form their own categories.

Oceania and Maritime Southeast Asia
Only the first 15 entries are shown here. For the entire list see: List of rampage killers in Oceania and Maritime Southeast Asia

This section contains cases that occurred in Oceania and the Maritime Southeast Asia.

Not included are school massacres, workplace killings, hate crimes or familicides, which form their own categories.

Workplace killings
Only the first 15 entries are shown here. For the entire list see: List of rampage killers (workplace killings) and List of rampage killers (workplace violence in the military)

The first part of this section contains those cases where the perpetrators predominantly targeted their former co-workers, while the second part focuses on cases where soldiers willfully killed their own comrades.

School massacres
Only the first 15 entries are shown here. For the entire list see: List of rampage killers (school massacres) 
See also List of school-related attacks

Massacres at kindergartens, schools and universities

Religious, political, or ethnic crimes
Only the first 15 entries are shown here. For the entire list see: List of rampage killers (religious, political, or ethnic crimes) and List of rampage killers (religious, political, or ethnic crimes in Asia) 
Mass murders, committed by lone wolf perpetrators, that have a foremost religious, political or racial background.

Familicides
Only the first 15 entries are shown here. For the entire list see: List of rampage killers (familicides in Africa), List of rampage killers (familicides in the Americas), List of rampage killers (familicides in the United States), List of rampage killers (familicides in Asia), List of rampage killers (familicides in China), List of rampage killers (familicides in Europe), List of rampage killers (familicides in Oceania and Maritime Southeast Asia).

This section contains these cases where at least half of the victims were relatives of the perpetrator or the perpetrator's spouse. Cases with more than one offender are not included.

Home intruders
Only the first 15 entries are shown here. For the entire list see: List of rampage killers (home intruders), List of rampage killers (home intruders in the United States), List of rampage killers (home intruders in Asia), List of rampage killers (home intruders in Europe)

This section contains those cases that either occurred mostly within a single household, or where most of the victims were members of a single family not related to the perpetrator. Cases where the primary motive for the murders was to facilitate or cover up another felony, like robbery, are not included.

Vehicular homicide
Only the first 15 entries are shown here. For the entire list see: List of rampage killers (vehicular homicide) 
This section contains those cases where only vehicles were used to attack people. Since it may be quite difficult to distinguish accidents, or cases of reckless driving from those incidents where the driver, or pilot, had the intention to harm others, only those cases are included where it is clear that the vehicle was applied as a weapon and crashed deliberately into people, other vehicles, or buildings. Also, those cases where a rampage killer used an armed vehicle, such as a tank, or a fighter aircraft, to shoot others are listed here. Airliners and trains are not included in this section but in other incidents.

Mass murders committed using grenades
This section lists mass murders where the perpetrator used only hand grenades or comparable explosive devices, like pipe bombs or dynamite sticks, for the attack. As it is sometimes difficult to distinguish cases of grenade attacks from acts of terrorism or gang-related attacks, incidents are only included where there is at least some indication that it was neither committed in the context of a political, ethnic, or religious conflict, nor part of an assault with more than one participating offender.

Other incidents

This section contains mass murders by single perpetrators that do not fit into the upper categories, like arson fires, poisonings, bombings, deliberate airliner crashes, and train derailments caused by sabotage. Cases with more than one offender are not included.

Annotation
The W-column gives a basic description of the weapons used in the murders
F – Firearms and other ranged weapons, especially rifles and handguns, but also bows and crossbows, grenade launchers, flamethrowers, or slingshots
M – Melee weapons, like knives, swords, spears, machetes, axes, clubs, rods, stones, or bare hands
O – Any other weapons, such as bombs, hand grenades, Molotov cocktails, poison and poisonous gas, as well as vehicle and arson attacks
V – indicates that a vehicle was the only other weapon used
A – indicates that an arson attack was the only other weapon used
E – indicates that explosives of any sort were the only other weapon used
P – indicates that an anaesthetising or deadly substance of any kind was the only other weapon used (includes poisonous gas)

See also
List of events named massacres
List of postal killings
Mass murder
School shooting
Spree killer

Notes

References

Bibliography
Chester, Graham: Berserk! – Motiveless Random Massacres; Michael O'Mara Books, 1993. 
O'Brien, Bill: Killing for Pleasure; Blake Publishing, 2001. 
Pantziarka, Pan: Lone Wolf – True Stories of Spree Killers; Virgin Publishing, 2002. 
Time-Life Staff: Mass Murderers; Time-Life Books, 1992.

External links
Duwe, Grant: The Rise and Decline of Mass Shootings, AOL News (March 1, 2010)
Fessenden, Ford: They Threaten, Seethe and Unhinge, Then Kill in Quantity, The New York Times (April 9, 2000)

Death-related lists
Lists by death toll
Mass murderers

Rampage